Cabinet of Hanna Suchocka was appointed by the Sejm on 11 July 1992 after Waldemar Pawlak failed to form a government. The government mas made up of 7 parties: Democratic Union, Christian National Union, Liberal Democratic Congress, Peasants' Agreement, People's Christian Party, Party of Christian Democrats and Polish Beer-Lovers' Party. On 28 May 1993 the Sejm passed on Vote of no confidence to the government which led to resignation of the government. President Lech Wałęsa didn't accept Suchocka's resignation and dissolved both houses of the parliament. Government worked without parliamentary control until 26 October 1993. Suchocka resigned again on 18 October 1993 and the government continued its duties until the inauguration of the Second Cabinet of Waldemar Pawlak on 26 October. New Sejm called up a commission to investigate government actions from 30 May to 14 October 1993. One of the investigated actions was signing the Concordat of 1993.

 
Political history of Poland
Poland